Rabbi David Avraham Spektor, also spelled Schpektor (9 Av 5715 – 12 Tishrei 5774) (9 August 1955 – 16 September 2013) was a Dutch–born Israeli rabbi. He was born in Amsterdam, the Netherlands and emigrated to Israel in 1973, after the Yom Kippur war. Rav Spektor studied at several Yeshivas for ten years, primarily at Yeshivat Mercaz HaRav and the Meretz Kollel. He was ordained by the Chief Rabbinate of Israel as both a Neighbourhood Rav (Rav Shechunah) and City Rav (Rav Ir).

Rabbinical posts
Rav Spektor held several prestigious Rabbinical and teaching posts:
 Rav of Hebrew University of Jerusalem
 Rav of the Nokdim community in Gush Etzion
 Army Chaplain (Rav Tzva'i) with the rank of lieutenant in artillery
 Lecturer in Michlelet Emunah college for women in Jerusalem (this last position continued concurrent with his dual service as a rabbi in Beit Shemesh and, when his health allowed him, until his untimely death)

In 5759 (1998), Rabbi Spektor was appointed the Ashkenazic Rav of the Givat Sharett neighborhood of Beit Shemesh. He was also appointed to be a member of the local Rabbinate of Beit Shemesh, responsible for Shabbat, Eruv, and Mikva'ot in Beit Shemesh.

Simultaneously, Rav Spektor was elected as the Rav of the Ohel Yonah Menachem congregation in Givat Sharett.

Rav Spektor delivered numerous Torah lessons throughout Beit Shemesh, and always made himself available to answer anyone's halachic and other questions or to counsel or help them in any way he could. Under Rav Spektor's direction, the area enclosed by the community was doubled in size and is now approximately 45 km2. In addition, he supervised the construction of four new Mikva'ot and the renovation of the two existing ones.

Rav Spektor died on 12 Tishrei 5774 (16 September 2013) after a two-year struggle with cancer.

Publications
Rav Spektor has published several books with approbations given by G'dolei Yisrael, including:
 El-David Responsa on actual Halachic questions
 Tahorat Eretz Yisrael discussing ritual purity in halacha and thought
 Torat Eretz Yisrael on the weekly portion
 Sefer HaGabbai
 Beit Shemesh, the Biblical town
 Herodian Responsa
 Drama, Art and Graphic Design Responsa

His wife, Rabbanit Chaya Spektor has also published a book:
 The Value of Childbirth in Jewish Sources

References

1955 births
2013 deaths
Israeli Orthodox rabbis
Mercaz HaRav alumni
Israeli people of Dutch-Jewish descent
Rabbis from Amsterdam
Place of death missing
People from Beit Shemesh